The 2016 World Wrestling Clubs Cup – Men's freestyle was the last of a set of three World Wrestling Clubs Cups in 2016.

Pool stage

Pool A

Pool B

Pool C

Pool D

Next level

Final ranking

See also 
 2016 Wrestling World Cup - Men's Greco-Roman
 2016 Wrestling World Cup - Men's freestyle

References

clubs, 2016
World Wrestling Clubs Cup
Wrestling
International sports competitions hosted by Ukraine
Sport in Kharkiv
Wrestling
Wrestling